La Première (stylised La 1ère) is the first French-language radio station in Switzerland, owned by RTS Radio Télévision Suisse. It began broadcasting in 1922 as the first overall radio station in Switzerland and only the third radio station to launch in Europe. Its programming is general, cultural and musical, its studios are located in Lausanne.

Broadcasting 
La Première is broadcast in Switzerland via FM, DAB, satellite radio (Hot Bird), cable radio and the Internet. Some programmes are provided as a podcast.

External links 
Official website

Radio stations established in 1922
1922 establishments in Switzerland
French-language radio stations in Switzerland
Mass media in Lausanne